Kajal Arefin Ome is a Bangladeshi television director. He is known for making comedy drama series Bachelor Point. His other notable works is Ex Boyfriend, Ex Girlfriend, Only me etc.

Works 
 Chok (2015)
 Maya (2015)
 Silence of Love (2015)
 Chobi (2016)
 Naam Ki (2016)
 Tattoo (2016)
 Khondokar Saheb (2016)
 Video (2016)
 Ekti Biral Birombona (2016)
 Family Love (2017)
 Kothay? (2017)
 Bhalo O Basha (2017)
 Basic Ali (2017-2019)
 Shada Kagoje Shajano Onuvuti (2017)
 Cinemar Moto Prem (2017)
 No Lies Tattoo 2 (2017)
 Feel in the Blanks (2018)
 Amar Biye (2018)
 Dear Bangladesh (2018)
 Tumi Jekhane Ami Sekhane (2018)
 Bachelor Point (2018; Present)
 Just Chill (2018)
 Passport (2018)
 Tattoo 3 (2018)
 No Answer (2018)
 Nimnochaap (2018)
 Ekti Shondeher Golpo
 Ekti Chithi - Amar Bijoy 2 (2018) - (short film)
 Sisters - Amar Bijoy 2 (2018) - (short film)
 Chaya - Amar Bijoy 2 (2018) - (short film)
 Ex Girlfriend (2019)
 Ex Boyfriend (2019)
 Sob Shomporker Naam Hoy Na (2019)
 Bad Dreams (2019)
 College Bunk (2019)
 Poribar Borgo (2019)
 Tom and Jerry (2019)
 Police The Real Hero (2019)
 Sorry Sir (2019)
 Arekti Shondeher Golpo (2019)
 The End (2019)
 The Tailor (2019)
 Tom and Jerry 2 (2019)
 Ex Wife (2019)
 Bad Man (2019)
 Bachelor Trip (2019)
 Generation Story (2019)
 Bachelor Eid (2019)
 Me & U (2019)
 Life Mate (2019)
 Beautyfool (2019)
 Disturb (2019)
 Incomplete (2019)
 Heart Beat (2019)
 Boka Bhalobasha (2019)
 Network Busy (2019)
 Arekti Biral Birombona (2019)
 Mission Barishal (2019)
 Only Me (2019)
 Fun (2019)
 Lol (2019)
 Morichika (2020)
 Sir I Love You (2020)
 Me & U: Last Chapter (2020)
 Stadium (2020)
 Love Bird (2020) - (short film)
 Commitment (2020) - (short film)
 Propose (2020) - (short film)
 Ambition (2020) - (short film)
 Bondings (2020) - (short film)
 Waiting (2020) - (short film)
 Hotath Dekha (2020)
 Bachelor Quarantine (2020)
 Mask (2020)
 Missing (2020)
 Why (2020)
 Single (2020)
 Kababer Haddi (2020) - (music video)
 Muthophone (2020)
 Sunglass (2020)
 Hello Baby (2021)
 Betar Bhalobasha (2021)
 Viral Girl (2021)
 Lota Audio (2021)
 Female (2021)
 ICU (2021)
 Wish (2021) - (short film)
 Propose 2 (2021) - (short film)
 Distance (2021) - (short film)
 Home (2021) - (short film)
 Status (2021) - (short film)
 Thanda (2021)
 Apon (2021)
 Od-Bhoot (2021)
 The Secret (2021)
 Doi (2022)
 The Kidnapper (2022)
 Bad Buzz (2022)
 Bachelor's Ramadan (2022)
 Female 2 (2022)
 Help Me (2022)
 B Desh (Upcoming)
 Bachelor Qurbani (2022)
 Good Buzz (2022)

References 

Living people
Bangladeshi screenwriters
People from Dhaka District
Bangladeshi television directors
Year of birth missing (living people)